Legless lizard may refer to any of several groups of lizards that have independently lost limbs or reduced them to the point of being of no use in locomotion. It is the common name for the family Pygopodidae. These lizards are often distinguishable from snakes on the basis of one or more of the following characteristics: possessing eyelids, possessing external ear openings, lack of broad belly scales, notched rather than forked tongue, having two more-or-less-equal lungs,  and/or having a very long tail (while snakes have a long body and short tail).

Many families of lizards have independently evolved limblessness or greatly reduced limbs (which are presumably non-functional in locomotion), including the following examples:
 Anguidae – 102 species, of which 17 are limbless and in the genera Ophisaurus, Pseudopus and Anguis from Eurasia and North America.
 Cordylidae – an African family of 66 species, with one virtually legless genus Chamaesaura, containing five species with hindlimbs reduced to small scaly protuberances.
 Pygopodidae – all 44 species; they belong to the genera Aprasia, Delma, Lialis, Ophidiocephalus, Paradelma, Pletholax and Pygopus. All are endemic to Australia, except the two species of Lialis, which also occur in New Guinea, one of which is endemic to that island. Pygopodids are not strictly legless since, although they lack forelimbs, they possess hindlimbs that are greatly reduced to small digitless flaps, hence the often used common names of "flap-footed lizards" or "scaly-foot". The pygopodids are considered an advanced evolutionary clade of the Gekkota, which also contains six families of geckos.
 Dibamidae – all 23 species in the family, which comprises the monotypic Mexican genus Anelytropsis and the Southeast Asian genus Dibamus. All are limbless burrowers that are nearly or completely blind. 
 Anniellidae – comprising the single genus Anniella, which contains six legless lizards that inhabit central / southern California and Baja California, Mexico.
 Gymnophthalmidae – a large neotropical family containing many species with reduced limbs, the most extreme being the 23 species in the genus Bachia, which escape by making sudden saltatory "figure-8" flicks with the body and tail.
 Scincidae – commonly known as skinks, the largest lizard family with over 1500 species, of which many are limbless and nearly-limbless species, including (but not confined to) the genera Acontias, Feylinia, Melanoseps, Paracontias and Typhlosaurus from Africa, Lerista from Australia, and some species in the genera Chalcides from southern Europe and North Africa, and Scelotes from southern Africa.
Amphisbaenia - comprising over 180 extant species, most of which are legless.

See also
 Limbless vertebrates

References